Black Is Beautiful is an album by singer Della Reese, released in 1970 by Avco Embassy Records. Containing soul-inspired pop songs supported by orchestral arrangements, the album rose to number 44 on Billboard R&B album chart, staying on the chart for two weeks in April 1970. Recorded in Los Angeles and New York City, the orchestra sessions were conducted by Peter Myers, and the song arrangements were by Myers (six songs) and Bobby Bryant (four songs.) Hugo & Luigi produced the album.

Track listing
 "Games People Play" (original by Joe South)
 "Compared to What" (original by Roberta Flack)
 "Choice of Colors" (original by the Impressions)
 "Get Together" (original by the Youngbloods)
 "With Pen in Hand" (original by Bobby Goldsboro)
 "Comment" (original by Charles Wright & the Watts 103rd Street Rhythm Band)
 "Proud Mary" (original by Creedence Clearwater Revival)
 "You Know How Love Is" (by June Jackson)
 "Cycles" (by Gayle Caldwell)
 "If Everybody In The World Loved Everybody In The World" (by Bobby Worth)

References

1970 albums
Della Reese albums
Avco Records albums